Irek Faritovich Gimayev (born September 2, 1957 in Sukkulovo, Russian SFSR, Soviet Union) is a Russian retired ice hockey defenceman.

Gimayev played in the Soviet Hockey League for Salavat Yulaev Ufa and HC CSKA Moscow.  He was inducted into the Russian and Soviet Hockey Hall of Fame in 1982 and is also an Honoured Master of Sport of the USSR. He is an ethnic Tatar.

References

External links
 
 Russian and Soviet Hockey Hall of Fame bio

1957 births
Sportspeople from Bashkortostan
Tatar sportspeople
Tatar people of Russia
HC CSKA Moscow players
HDD Olimpija Ljubljana players
Honoured Masters of Sport of the USSR
Living people
Oji Eagles players
Russian ice hockey coaches
Russian ice hockey defencemen
Soviet ice hockey defencemen
Salavat Yulaev Ufa players
Soviet expatriate ice hockey players
Soviet expatriate sportspeople in Yugoslavia
Russian expatriate sportspeople in Slovenia
Soviet expatriate sportspeople in Japan